Ashby Street Car Barn, locally known as the Ashby Street Trolley Barn, is a historic interurban carhouse in Atlanta, Georgia. It was constructed by the Atlanta Northern Railway Company in 1927, replacing a previous structure built in 1904. The carhouse was the major maintenance facility for the Atlanta/Marietta interurban, which ran until January 31, 1947. It had six parallel tracks inside.

The carhouse was renovated in 1998 and 1999 for use as lofts and a brewery, as part of the King Plow Arts Center project. It was added to the National Register of Historic Places on August 6, 1998.

See also
National Register of Historic Places listings in Fulton County, Georgia

References

National Register of Historic Places in Atlanta
Infrastructure completed in 1927